Dock Mathieson (May 20, 1914 - December 1985) was a Scottish film score arranger, composer and conductor. He was born in Stirling with the name John Davie Mathieson.

He was the younger brother of Muir Mathieson, another film score composer, arranger and conductor. On the death of Ernest Irving (Muir's older counterpart at Ealing Studios) in October 1953, Dock took over the position as director of music at Ealing. Dock died in Oxford.

Selected filmography

Conductor
Lease of Life (1954)
Out of the Clouds (1954)
The Ladykillers (1955)
The Angry Hills (1959)
The Siege of Pinchgut (1959)	
Hunted in Holland (1960)
Light in the Piazza (1961)

Musical director
The Square Ring (1953)
Nowhere to Go (1959)

References

1914 births
1985 deaths
People from Stirling
Scottish composers
Scottish conductors (music)
British male conductors (music)
20th-century British conductors (music)
20th-century British composers
20th-century Scottish musicians
20th-century British male musicians
British male film score composers
Date of death missing